"Help Me" is a blues standard first recorded by Sonny Boy Williamson II in 1963.  The song, a mid-tempo twelve-bar blues, is credited to Williamson, Willie Dixon, and Ralph Bass and is based on the 1962 instrumental hit "Green Onions" by Booker T. and the MGs.  "Help Me" became a hit in 1963 and reached  number 24 in the Billboard R&B chart.

The song was later included on the 1966 Williamson compilation More Folk Blues.  In 1987, "Help Me" was inducted into the Blues Foundation Hall of Fame in the "Classic of Blues Recordings" category. It is featured on many Sonny Boy Williamson greatest hits albums including His Best.

References

External links
Sonny Boy Williamson II Help Me

Blues songs
1963 singles
Sonny Boy Williamson II songs
Van Morrison songs
Songs written by Willie Dixon
Checker Records singles
Songs written by Ralph Bass
Ten Years After songs
1963 songs